Khabar Rural District may refer to:
 Khabar Rural District (Baft County)
 Khabar Rural District (Shahr-e Babak County)